Thomas Francis Ford (February 18, 1873 – December 26, 1958) was an American politician, journalist, and editor who served as a member of the U.S. House of Representatives from California from 1933 to 1945. He was previously a member of the Los Angeles City Council, and the only member to have been elected by a write-in vote.

Early life and career 

Ford was born on February 18, 1873, in Saint Louis, Missouri, the son of Thomas Ford and Ellen Ferris. He went to public and private schools in Saint Louis and in Toledo, Ohio, and studied law in that city.

He was with the U.S. Post Office Department after 1896 and then moved westward in 1900 to work on newspapers in Idaho and Washington, before arriving in Los Angeles in 1904. Thomas Francis Ford married Martha Alison McCracken on 22 October 1901 in Pittsburgh, Pennsylvania. Martha died 5 February 1905 in Toledo, Lucas, Ohio.

Cole traveled extensively in Europe between 1909 and 1913, where he wrote newspaper feature articles on foreign trade. On June 21, 1911, he was married in Los Angeles to Lillian Cope Cummings, with whom he wrote a book, The Foreign Trade of the United States, published in 1920. Between 1913 and 1918 he was the West Coast correspondent for the Washington Post, and on January 1, 1919, he became the literary editor of the Los Angeles Times, where he also edited the rotogravure section. He was a lecturer on international trade at the University of Southern California in 1920–21. In the 1930s he was living at 940 North Benton Way, Los Angeles.

Public service

Los Angeles

By October 1930, Ford had left the Times and was working in the publicity department of the city's Water and Power Department. He resigned on December 11, 1930.

He ran for the 12th District seat in 1931, and, "supported by friends and supporters of the late incumbent" councilman Thomas W. Williams in that district, he was nominated by a write-in vote in the primary. He beat Douglas E. Foster in the final election by 8,315 votes to 5,882.

HIghlights of his two years as a councilman included:

 1931 Voting against instructing the city attorney to appeal a judge's decision ordering the city to stop the practice of segregating its swimming pools by race. The vote was 6 in favor of an appeal and 8 opposed, including Ford, a vote that resulted in the pools' being immediately desegregated in summer 1931.
 1931 Submitting a motion calling on the Police Department to "concentrate its efforts on major crime instead of petty infractions of the law." He claimed that underworld "gambling joints flourish under 'protection' to the extent that it has become a citywide scandal."
 1932 Investigating reports that City Prosecutor Johnson had issued an unusually high number of special investigators badges in advance of an election in which Johnson was running for a municipal judgeship in opposition to Judge Isaac Pacht. "We feel that the people of Los  Angeles are entitled to know why the badges were issued, to whom presented, for what purpose, and who paid for them," he said. Pacht won the election.
 1932 Sponsoring a proposal that would have the city establish a public works program  for the unemployed, with the workers being paid in certificates that would be used in lieu of cash. The certificates would have been financed by a voluntary 4-cent tax on each merchant handling them.
 1932 Attacking Mayor John C. Porter over the mayor's attempts to remove three members of the Water and Power Commission, one of whom was Ford's former campaign manager.
 1932 Proposing a pay cut of 8.3 percent for city workers instead of reducing the work week to five days as previously ordered by the council.

Congress

Ford, a Democrat, served in the U.S. Congress 1933–45 and was not a candidate for renomination in 1944.

Death 
Ford died on December 26, 1958, in his home at 1705 Spruce Street, South Pasadena, and was buried at Forest Lawn Memorial Park, Glendale.

References

Access to the Los Angeles Times links requires the use of a library card.

Further reading
 The foreign trade of the United States; its character, organization and methods, by L. C. Ford and Thomas F. Ford; with an introduction by W. L. Saunders

1873 births
1958 deaths
Democratic Party members of the United States House of Representatives from California
Los Angeles City Council members
Politicians from St. Louis
Burials at Forest Lawn Memorial Park (Glendale)